Kim Jun-ho (born 11 December 2002) is a South Korean footballer currently playing as a midfielder for Pohang Steelers.

Career statistics

Club

Notes

References

2002 births
Living people
South Korean footballers
Association football midfielders
K League 1 players
Pohang Steelers players